Honoratus (c. 350 – 6 January 429) was the founder of Lérins Abbey who later became an early Archbishop of Arles. He is honored as a saint in the Catholic and Eastern Orthodox Churches.

Life
Honoratus was born in the north of Gaul to a consular Roman family. He received an outstanding education. He converted to Christianity with his brother Venantius, and embarked with him from Marseilles about 368, under the guidance of a holy person named Caprasius, to visit the holy places of Palestine and the lauræ of Syria and Egypt. But the death of Venantius, occurring suddenly at Methone, Achaia, prevented the pious travellers from going further. They returned to Gaul through Italy, and, after having stopped at Rome, Honoratus went on into Provence. Encouraged by Leontius of Fréjus, he took up his abode on the wild Lérins Island today called the Île Saint-Honorat, with the intention of living there in solitude.

Lerins
Numerous disciples soon gathered around Honoratus, including Lupus of Troyes, Eucherius of Lyon, and Hilary of Arles. Thus was founded the Monastery of Lérins, which has enjoyed so great a celebrity status and which was, during the 5th and 6th centuries, a nursery for illustrious bishops and remarkable ecclesiastical writers. His Rule of Life was chiefly borrowed from that of St. Pachomius. It is believed St. Patrick trained there for his missionary work in Ireland.

Archbishop of Arles
Honoratus's reputation for sanctity throughout the southeastern portion of Gaul was such that in 426 after the assassination of Patroclus, Archbishop of Arles, he was summoned from his solitude to succeed to the government of the diocese, which the Arian and Manichaean beliefs had greatly disturbed. He appears to have succeeded in re-establishing order and orthodoxy, while still continuing to direct from afar the monks of Lérins. 

He died in the arms of Hilary, one of his disciples and probably a relative, who was to succeed him in the See of Arles. Hilary wrote the Sermo de Vita Sancti Honorati probably around 430.

Honoratus' various writings have not been preserved, nor has the Rule which he gave to the solitaries of Lérins. John Cassian, who had visited his monastery, dedicated to him several of his "Conferences".

La Vida de Sant Honorat
In the Middle Ages, Honaratus was the object of a pilgrimage in the Arles region, especially around Lérins Abbey, because of the writings in Occitan of Raymond Féraud (or Raimon Feraud), a monk who composed a hagiographical life for him around 1300 in Roquesteron.

Legacy
One of the Lérins islands near the Antibes off the French Riviera is  now called St. Honorat in his honor.

Gallery

See also

 Saint Honoratus, patron saint archive

References

Sources
Attwater, Donald and Catherine Rachel John. The Penguin Dictionary of Saints. 3rd edition. New York: Penguin Books, 1993. .

350 births
429 deaths
Hermits
Abbots
Archbishops of Arles
5th-century bishops in Gaul
5th-century Christian saints
Gallo-Roman saints
Burials at the Basilica of St. Sernin
5th-century Latin writers